Lake Creek High School (LCHS) is a high school in unincorporated Montgomery County, Texas, in the United States. It is the second high school built by Montgomery Independent School District.  The school was built after enrollment at Montgomery High School exceeded building capacity. Lake Creek opened on August 21, 2018, for the 2018–2019 school year. The first principal was Phil Eaton. The school is located on Farm to Market Road 2854.

Lake Creek High School is named after the Lake Creek Settlement: an early settlement in Stephen F. Austin's Second Colony established before Texas' independence from Mexico. This is actually where the Lion Mascot's name, Stephen, comes from.

History
On May 9, 2015, voters within Montgomery ISD's attendance zone voted in favor of a $256.75 million bond. The bond package included the construction of three schools: a high school, middle school and elementary school. The new high school was included to reduce enrollment at the district's other high school, Montgomery High School, whose student population had risen beyond the school's capacity. Board members decided to name the new school after the Lake Creek Settlement, the first Anglo-American settlement in Montgomery County. The district conducted a survey of future students to determine the school's mascot and colors. The school opened in August 2018 at a cost of $98.28 million. For the 2018–2019 academic year, the school opened with around 900 students in ninth, tenth, and eleventh grades. The school fully incorporated seniors in the 2019–2020 academic year.

The school was closed from March 11 to May 4, 2020, over fears of the coronavirus pandemic.

In October 2021, Principal Phil Eaton announced that he would retire in December of that year.  His career spanned 43 years; 13 of which in Montgomery ISD. The school district's assistant superintendent for secondary education, Duane McFadden, was named Lake Creek High School's interim principal for the remainder of the 2021–2022 school year.

In April 2022, the Montgomery ISD Board of Trustees approved the selection of Tim Williams, the then Principal at Oak Hills JH, as the next Principal of Lake Creek High School.

Demographics
As of the 2018–2019 school year, LCHS had 914 students enrolled.

78.0% White
15.4% Hispanic
1.8% Asian
1.6% African American 
1.0% American Indian
0.2% Pacific Islander
2.0% of two or more races

22.2% of students were eligible for free or reduced-price lunch.

Academics
In accordance with House bill 5 of the 83rd Texas Legislature, Lake Creek High School offers instruction in "core foundation" subjects and "endorsement pathways." Foundation courses include traditional subjects such as English, math, science, and social studies. Originally, to fulfill the foreign language requirement, students could take either Spanish or French. After just one year, the school discontinued the French program, leaving only one language for students to take.

HB5 designates four "endorsement pathways" that students may follow: Arts and Humanities, Business and Industry, Public Service and STEM (Science, Technology, Engineering, Mathematics). For Arts and Humanities, students at Lake Creek High School may take courses such as art, band, choir, dance, debate, journalism and theater arts. For Business and Industry, the school offers courses in agriculture, business, information technology and manufacturing. For Public Service, students may take courses in education, health science, fashion and law enforcement. For STEM, students make take courses in engineering or computer science.

For the 2018–2019 school year, it was given an A rating by the Texas Education Agency.

Sports

The school offers competitive athletics in the following sports: American football, volleyball, basketball, soccer, baseball, softball, track, cross country, swimming, tennis and golf. Students may also participate in cheerleading and the "Royals" dance team.

Softball

On June 4, 2022, the Lake Creek High School softball team won the 2022 University Interscholastic League 5A State Championship at Red and Charline McCombs Field at the University of Texas at Austin by defeating the Georgetown High School (Texas) Eagles 7-0. The Lake Creek Lions completed a perfect season (41-0) in which they did not lose a single game and became Lake Creek High School's first sports team to win a state championship. Over the course of the season, the Lions outscored their opponents 337-33. The Lake Creek High School (Texas) softball team was named the 2022 USA Today High School Sports Awards Girls Team of the Year on July 31, 2022.

Basketball
Boys’ Basketball has made the post season every year since the school's inception in 2018. In the 2019–2020 season, the boys' basketball team were regional semi-finalists. They were the first team from Montgomery County to advance to the fourth round since The Woodlands College Park High School did so in 2012.

Soccer

After an inaugural season with one win, Lake Creek's boys' soccer team was restructured.

Campus
Lake Creek High School has six athletic fields and a 996-seat auditorium.

In March 2018 an area resident asked the district to construct a sound barrier so his house would get less noise from air conditioners used for the school.

Attendance and feeder patterns
At opening, all sophomores and juniors at Montgomery High School were allowed to choose which high school they attended through an "intra-district transfer". This policy was walked back in 2019 by the school board. As Assistant Superintendent Duane McFadden explained, "You don't get to choose what school you go to."

The following elementary schools (K-5) feed into Lake Creek High School:

 Keenan
 Lone Star
 Stewart Creek (partial)

Oak Hills Junior High School (6-8) is the sole junior high feeder into Lake Creek High School.

References

External links
Montgomery ISD
Exciting Times as MISD’s New Schools Named

High schools in Montgomery County, Texas
Educational institutions established in 2018
2018 establishments in Texas